Oxyna fenestrata is a species of fruit fly in the family Tephritidae.

Distribution
Scandinavia.

References

Tephritinae
Insects described in 1847
Diptera of Europe